This is a list of endorsements for declared candidates in the Democratic primaries for the 1920 United States presidential election.

Woodrow Wilson

Alexander Palmer

Edward Edwards

Herbert Hoover

References

1920 United States Democratic presidential primaries
United States presidential election endorsements